The 2006 Chinese Grand Prix (officially the 2006 Formula 1 Sinopec Chinese Grand Prix) was the sixteenth race of the 2006 Formula One season. It was held on 1 October 2006 at Shanghai International Circuit, Shanghai. The race was won by Michael Schumacher, driving a Ferrari, and would turn out to be the 91st and last victory of his Formula One career. It was also his last podium finish until the 2012 European Grand Prix, during his comeback to the sport, and the last win for a German driver until Sebastian Vettel won the 2008 Italian Grand Prix and also the last win for a German Ferrari driver until again Vettel won the 2015 Malaysian Grand Prix.

Report

Background
Renault were very confident about their chances in this Grand Prix, they claimed that Michael Schumacher's previous two races in Shanghai were "poor". Schumacher did admit that he had bad form in China, but said that he expected it "to be better this time around."

Following back-to-back wins in Turkey and on home soil, Ferrari certainly had the momentum coming into the Grand Prix, the Italian team were also ahead of Renault by 3 points in the constructors championship and Michael Schumacher was 2 points behind Fernando Alonso in the Drivers' Championship.

Following Lewis Hamilton's GP2 victory in Monza and an encouraging test session with McLaren, the Woking-based team were rumoured to give the young British driver his debut in favour of Pedro de la Rosa, who had been performing well after replacing Juan Pablo Montoya.  However, McLaren announced that de la Rosa would be racing in China. McLaren's other driver, Kimi Räikkönen, was aiming to win the weekend's Grand Prix following signs of speed in his previous Grand Prix.

Williams announced that they were using a revised FW28, the Williams-Cosworth FW28A. The car featured a new aerodynamic package developed by test drivers Alexander Wurz and Narain Karthikeyan. The test team also carried out the first track test of the Toyota-powered interim Williams FW28B. The car itself completed 745 kilometres and the team only experienced minor problems.

Following some impressive Friday test performances at Turkey and Italy, BMW Sauber's 19-year-old test driver, Sebastian Vettel, had agreed to see out the rest of the year with the German team. The young German driver had a busy schedule, as he was also competing in the Formula 3 Euroseries.

With the sacking of Christian Klien, Red Bull announced that Robert Doornbos would replace him for the final 3 Grands Prix. Replacing Doornbos's role as the third driver was GP2 driver Michael Ammermüller.

Toro Rosso announced during the week leading up to the Grand Prix, that they had signed Alex Hitzinger as their new technical director to replace Gabriele Tredozi. Hitzinger began his role in November 2006.

Spyker MF1 announced their first driver for 2007 during the weekend, which was Dutch driver Christijan Albers.

Super Aguri's Takuma Sato had a dismal start to the weekend as he was demoted ten places on the grid as his team changed the Honda engine in his car. Sato had been due to continue using the Honda V8 he ran at the last round in Italy, but the discovery of a problem, which had not been disclosed by Super Aguri, had prompted the team to replace the engine ahead of the Friday first practice session.

Friday practice
Alexander Wurz was fastest in the first Friday practice session in the Williams-Cosworth, 0.004 seconds faster than BMW Sauber's third driver, Sebastien Vettel and Jenson Button completed the top three, over six-tenths slower than Wurz. Michael Schumacher, Neel Jani and Alexandre Prémat completed the top six; all within 0.07 seconds of each other. While Schumacher's championship rival, Fernando Alonso, did not set a time along with his teammate, Giancarlo Fisichella.

Wurz and Vettel were fastest again in the second session, Wurz was fastest with a 1:35.539, around 0.03 seconds faster than he was in the first session and 0.05 seconds faster than Vettel with Honda's Anthony Davidson completing the top three positions. The Austrian was very happy with his time, specially since this was his first time in Shanghai, "It was a good day today and driving was a lot of fun out there. I have never driven this circuit, and I attacked it right from the beginning" he said. Championship rivals, Michael Schumacher and Fernando Alonso, were within a tenth of a second of each other in fifth and sixth, respectively. Felipe Massa dropped ten places from the grid after his engine gave way during the session.

Friday drivers
The bottom 6 teams in the 2005 Constructors' Championship and Super Aguri were entitled to run a third car in free practice on Friday. These drivers drove on Friday but did not compete in qualifying or the race.

Race
It rained heavily before the start of the race, suiting the Michelin runners and disadvantaging the Bridgestone runners. Fernando Alonso led away at the start, followed by Giancarlo Fisichella. Kimi Räikkönen passed both Hondas at the start and immediately started to pressure Fisichella. Robert Kubica and Robert Doornbos collided, resulting in Kubica being knocked off the track and Doornbos losing his front wing. On lap 8, Michael Schumacher overtook Rubens Barichello for fifth. On lap 14, Schumacher passed Jenson Button for fourth. On the same lap Räikkönen finally managed to pass Fisichella, having been stuck behind him ever since the start. Räikkönen immediately began to pull away from Fisichella and erode the 15 second gap to Alonso. At this point in the race, Alonso was over 25 seconds ahead of Schumacher. However, the track was now drying and beginning to favour the Bridgestones more and more. By lap 19, Schumacher had caught up to Fisichella. He was also gaining on Alonso, who was beginning to struggle with his tyres and had several off-track moments. Schumacher gained another place when Räikkönen retired with a mechanical failure. Räikkönen later said that he felt he could have won the race, as he had been steadily gaining on Alonso before his retirement.

The new leading trio of Alonso, Fisichella and Schumacher made their first pit stops on laps 22, 23 and 21, respectively. Fisichella and Schumacher both kept all the same tyres, but Alonso, whose tyres were already fading, was unsure about whether they could last all the way to the second pit stops, so he changed the front tyres, but left the same rear tyres. However, this disadvantaged him even more, and within a few laps his 20-second lead had evaporated to nothing. For several laps, Alonso, Fisichella and Schumacher ran nose to tail. On lap 29, Fisichella tried to pass Alonso down the back straight, but braked too late and ran wide, allowing Alonso to regain the lead. The following lap, he pulled off the maneuver successfully and immediately began to pull away. Only a few corners later, at the start of lap 31, Schumacher passed Alonso and chased after Fisichella. He was able to stay with him but unable to seriously threaten to overtake.

Alonso dropped back all the time and on lap 35, having seen several drivers switch to dry tyres and be able to handle the drying conditions, pitted and made the switch. However a wheel nut problem at his stop caused it to last over 19 seconds. When he emerged from his stop he was down in 4th and over 50 seconds off the lead. Schumacher and Fisichella were among the last drivers to switch to dry tyres, pitting on laps 40 and 41 respectively. Fisichella emerged from his stop still ahead of Schumacher, but struggling with his cold tyres ran wide at the first corner, allowing Schumacher through into the lead.

Alonso had now rediscovered his pace and charged in the closing stages, setting fastest lap after fastest lap. Fisichella let him past without a fight, but although he continued to close rapidly on Schumacher, he ran out of time to catch him, finishing just 3 seconds behind. Fisichella had dropped back hugely in the closing laps but hung on to a comfortable third place.

Nick Heidfeld had started eighth on the grid but through his strategy of pitting late at both pitstops had rising to fourth in the closing stages, leapfrogging Rubens Barrichello, Jenson Button and Pedro de la Rosa. However, in the closing stages Heidfeld was firstly forced off the track while trying to lap Christijan Albers, then held up by Takuma Sato's Super Aguri, allowing Barrichello, Button and de la Rosa to close up to him. Button first managed to find his way past Barrichello on the last lap, then, at the penultimate corner, boxed Heidfeld in behind Sato, taking fourth. Barrichello then braked too late at the same corner, running into the back of Heidfeld, knocking the BMW Sauber's right rear wheel askew and damaging his own front wing. This allowed de la Rosa through to take fifth, Barrichello sixth, and the furious Heidfeld limped home seventh.

Post-race
The result put Michael Schumacher equal on points with Fernando Alonso, and put him in the championship lead on countback. However, Fisichella's third place allowed Renault to regain the lead of the Constructors' Championship by one point from Ferrari, as well as vaulting Fisichella ahead of Felipe Massa in the battle for third in the Drivers' Championship, also by one point. After the race, Schumacher expressed his surprise at the performance of his car in the wet, after its dismal showing in qualifying. Alonso expressed his regret over the decision to change only the front tyres at his first stop, but also his encouragement at the pace his car had shown throughout the weekend. Both championship contenders were confident heading into the final two races of the season.

Classification

Qualifying

Notes
  – Felipe Massa and Takuma Sato each received a 10-place grid penalty for engine changes.
  – Christijan Albers was demoted to the back of the grid for failing to bring his car into the weighbridge when instructed to do so.

Race

Notes
  – Christijan Albers received a 25-second time penalty for ignoring blue flags.
  – Takuma Sato originally finished 14th, but was disqualified for ignoring blue flags.

Championship standings after the race

Drivers' Championship standings

Constructors' Championship standings

 Note: Only the top five positions are included for both sets of standings.
 Bold text indicates competitors who still had a theoretical chance of becoming World Champion.

References

External links

 Detailed Chinese Grand Prix results
 Trackpedia guide to driving the Shanghai Circuit

Chinese Grand Prix
Grand Prix
Chinese Grand Prix
Chinese Grand Prix